is a town located in Sorachi Subprefecture, Hokkaido, Japan.

As of September 2016, the town has an estimated population of 12,365, and a density of 61 persons per km2. The total area is 203.84 km2.

Notable people from Kuriyama
Tadashi Watanabe, computer engineer

References

External links

Official Website 

Towns in Hokkaido